Helenopolis was a possibly a town and episcopal see in ancient Lydia, reported by the Catholic Encyclopedia (1910), but refuted by William Mitchell Ramsay in his The Historical Geography of Asia Minor (1890) where he claims that Le Quien "invented" the place by misreading the Greek records.

Ecclesiastical history
The episcopal see of Helenopolis was a suffragan of the See of Sardis in Lydia.

References

 Sophrone Pétridès "Helenopolis", The Catholic Encyclopedia, 1910. Retrieved February 21, 2010 New Advent

Populated places in ancient Lydia
Populated places of the Byzantine Empire
Defunct dioceses of the Ecumenical Patriarchate of Constantinople
History of Christianity in Turkey